KOMTEVE (Komunitas Televisi, Indonesian Television Community) is an Indonesian non-profit organization composed of TV broadcasting professionals from various television stations in Indonesia. KOMTEVE's main mission is to promote public control over TV channels in Indonesia, as well as accountability over television broadcasting content.

Television organizations in Indonesia